Michaël Lallemand (born 11 February 1993) is a Belgian footballer who plays for Dender in the Challenger Pro League.

External links
 
 

1993 births
Living people
Belgian footballers
Association football defenders
K.A.S. Eupen players
K.V. Kortrijk players
Royal Antwerp F.C. players
K.M.S.K. Deinze players
RFC Liège players
F.C.V. Dender E.H. players
Belgian Third Division players
Belgian Pro League players
Challenger Pro League players